The BUCS Basketball League system is where the British Universities and Colleges Sport (BUCS) basketball teams of the universities and colleges in the United Kingdom compete.

League Structure

The BUCS Basketball League system consists of two regional Premier Leagues, North and South.  Below this are five regional conferences, Northern, Midlands, Western, South Eastern, and Scottish. Each of these regional conferences consist of a number of divisions that are ranked on a tier system. Tier 1 has a single division covering the entire region, while Tier 2 and below are sub-divided (except in Scotland) into A and B divisions on a geographical basis. A team may be promoted or demoted to a higher or lower division respectively, subject to results within their division at the end of the season and the results of playoffs.

The League format is summarised below:

All teams also participate in one of three knockout cups, depending on league position (Premier – Championship Tier 1 – Trophy; lower tiers – Conference Cup),.

Past results

External links
BUSA Basketball
Season's Information
Rules & Regulations
2008 Championships
Disciplinary
Sports Management Group
Links
Affiliations
Archived Results
Representative Sport

References

Basketball leagues in the United Kingdom
Basketball